Voter ID laws in the United States are laws that require a person to provide some form of official identification before they are permitted to register to vote, receive a ballot for an election, or to actually vote in elections in the United States.

At the federal level, the Help America Vote Act of 2002 requires a voter ID for all new voters in federal elections who registered by mail and who did not provide a driver's license number or the last four digits of a Social Security number that was matched against government records. Though state laws requiring some sort of identification at voting polls go back to 1950, no state required a voter to produce a government-issued photo ID as a condition for voting before the 2006 elections. Indiana became the first state to enact a strict photo ID law, which was upheld two years later by the U.S. Supreme Court. As of 2021, 36 states have enacted some form of voter ID requirement. Lawsuits have been filed against many of the voter ID requirements on the basis that they are discriminatory with an intent to reduce voting. The proliferation of voter ID laws has prompted non-partisan, non-profit organizations like League of Women Voters and VoteRiders to work with and for U.S. citizens so that everyone who is eligible to cast a vote can do so.

Proponents of voter ID laws argue that they reduce electoral fraud while placing only little burden on voters. Opponents argue that voter ID laws are unnecessary due to the fact that electoral fraud is extremely rare in the United States and has been shown to be unlikely to result in any plausible impact on the outcome of elections.

Parts of voter ID laws in several states have been overturned by courts.

State-by-state requirements

The National Conference of State Legislatures (NCSL) provides a web page and a map with ID requirements for voting in each state. In states with strict ID laws, the voter is required to take additional action after the provisional ballot is cast to verify ID. The NCSL website describes strict states as follows:

In the "strict" states, a voter cannot cast a valid ballot without first presenting ID. Voters who are unable to show ID at the polls are given a provisional ballot. Those provisional ballots are kept separate from the regular ballots. If the voter returns to election officials within a short period of time after the election (generally a few days) and presents acceptable ID, the provisional ballot is counted. If the voter does not come back to show ID, that provisional ballot is never counted.

In states with non-strict voter ID laws, other methods of validation are allowed, which vary by state. Possible alternatives are: signing an affidavit, having a poll worker vouch for voter, having election officials verify a voter's identity after the vote is cast, or having the voter return an inquiry mailed to their reported address.

The NCSL categorizes state-level voter ID laws as follows:
 Photo ID required (strict): Georgia, Indiana, Kansas, Mississippi, Tennessee, Arkansas, and Wisconsin.
 Photo ID requested (non-strict): Alabama, Florida, Montana, South Carolina, Hawaii, Idaho, Louisiana, Michigan, Rhode Island, South Dakota, and Texas.
 Non-photo ID required (strict): Arizona, North Dakota, Wyoming, and Ohio.
 Non-photo ID requested (non-strict): Alaska, Colorado, Connecticut, Delaware, Iowa, Kentucky, Missouri, New Hampshire, Oklahoma, Utah, Washington, Virginia, and West Virginia.
 No ID required to vote at ballot box: California, Illinois, Maine, Maryland, Massachusetts, Minnesota, Nebraska, Nevada, New Jersey, New Mexico, New York, North Carolina, Oregon, Pennsylvania, Vermont, and Washington, D.C.

History 
Voter ID laws go back to 1950, when South Carolina became the first state to start requesting identification from voters at the polls. The identification document did not have to include a picture; any document with the name of the voter sufficed. In 1970, Hawaii joined in requiring ID, and Texas a year later. Florida was next in 1977, and Alaska in 1980 to become the first five states in the United States to request identification of some sort from voters at the polls.

In 1999, Virginia Governor Jim Gilmore attempted to start a pilot program that required voters to show IDs at the polls. His initiative was blocked by Democrats and the NAACP, and was stopped by court order. His administration had spent and mailed $275,000 worth of free voter ID cards to residents in Arlington and Fairfax counties.

Afterward Republican-dominated states have worked to pass laws for voter IDs, ostensibly to prevent "voter fraud", which studies have shown is "vanishingly rare." Opponents say that many of the provisions of such laws are a conspiracy designed to disadvantage minorities, poor and elderly, many of whom have tended in recent years to vote Democratic, so the Republicans are deriving political benefits from their voter ID campaign. In 2002, President George W. Bush signed the Help America Vote Act into law, which required all first-time voters in federal elections to show photo or non-photo ID upon either registration or arrival at the polling place.

In 2004, Arizona passed a law requiring voters to bring a state-issued photo ID to the polling place. Similar proposals were discussed in various other states and were passed in some cases. In several states, a person's citizenship status is noted on their photo ID.

An Indiana law requiring a photo ID be shown by all voters before casting ballots went into effect on July 1, 2005. Civil rights groups in Indiana launched a lawsuit, Crawford v. Marion County Election Board, that reached the Supreme Court in 2008. The Court ruled that the law was constitutional, paving the way for expanded ID laws in other states.

In 2011, Wisconsin Governor Scott Walker (WI Act 23) and Ohio Governor John Kasich enacted similar laws. Texas Governor Rick Perry placed a voter ID bill as an "emergency item" in 2011, allowing legislators to rush it through the process. Jurisdiction over Texas election procedure had been given to the Department of Justice, which was required to pre-clear the law for approval. The Texas law recognized government-issued photo identification and weapons permits but not college IDs, resulting in criticism that the law was unfavorable to young voters, who trend liberal, while favorable to gun owners, who trend conservative. Rhode Island passed a voter ID law in 2011; it is the only state with a Democratic-controlled legislature to do so.

In South Carolina, Gov. Nikki Haley enacted a 2011 law requiring government-issued IDs at the polls, which included provisions for the issuance of free IDs. Haley made a one-time offer to arrange for voter ID applicants to be driven to issuing locations. The ID requirement was blocked by the Justice Department.

Wisconsin's Voter ID law in 2011 provided free IDs to people who did not have them. But in practice, state employees at the DMV were instructed to provide the IDs for free only if people specifically asked to have their fee waived. The requirement to show photo ID had been declared in violation of the Wisconsin Constitution and blocked by state and federal judges, but those decisions were overturned by the Wisconsin Supreme Court and later the 7th Circuit Court of Appeals. Weeks later, the U.S. Supreme Court again blocked the law for 2014. On March 23, 2015, the U.S. Supreme Court rejected an appeal by the ACLU, effectively upholding the 7th Circuit's decision Wisconsin's voter ID law as constitutional.

Pennsylvania's voter ID law allowed various forms of photo identification cards, including those held by drivers, government employees, in-state college students, and residents of elder-care facilities. Voters who do not possess these forms of identification can obtain voting-only photo IDs issued by the Pennsylvania Department of State through the Pennsylvania Department of Transportation (PennDOT). A judicial order on October 2, 2012, blocked enforcement of Pennsylvania's law until after the 2012 Presidential election.  Following a trial in the summer of 2013 and a six-month delay, Commonwealth Court Judge Bernard L. McGinley struck down Pennsylvania's voter ID law on January 17, 2014, as violative of the constitutional rights of state voters.

He noted that required alternative voter IDs were available only through 71 PennDOT Drivers Licensing Centers across the state. Five of the 71 DLCs are located in Philadelphia, nine counties have no DLCs at all, and DLCs have limited hours: in nine counties they are open only one day per week, and in 13 counties they are open only two days per week. The court ruled that the Pennsylvania Department of State provided too little access, no financial support to provide IDs to those without access, and no alternatives to obtaining the required IDs.  Judge McGinley found that this leaves about half of Pennsylvania without DLCs for five days a week, imposing a significant barrier to obtaining Pennsylvania's "free ID". Photo IDs are not required to vote in PA.

Voters in Minnesota rejected a voter ID proposal on the 2012 general election ballot by a margin of 54–46%. It is the only such ballot defeat for a voter ID law in the country.

Push for photo ID requirements
Since the late 20th century, the Republican Party has led efforts to create more stringent voter ID laws for the stated objective of preventing voter fraud. Twelve states now require voters to show some form of photo identification (see table below) with approximately the same number currently pursuing similar legislation. Republican members of ALEC often introduced the laws, which were then signed by Republican governors.

Some states pursuing new photo identification requirements had been required by the Voting Rights Act of 1965 to get federal preclearance prior to enacting new election laws. However, in the 2013 case Shelby County v. Holder, the United States Supreme Court struck down section 4(b) of the Act, which contained the formula that determined, based on historic racial discrimination, which states were required to seek preclearance. The court ruled the section unconstitutional, finding that although the provision had been rational and necessary at the time it had been enacted, changing demographics had rendered its formula inaccurate and no longer applicable. As a result, in states previously required to have preclearance, statutes requiring voter ID were able to immediately take effect .

According to a 2021 report by the Brennan Center for Justice, the states of Arkansas, Florida, Georgia, Montana, New Hamshire, Texas, and Wyoming all enacted restrictive Voter ID requirements which make it harder for Americans to vote.

Court challenges
The practical effect of striking out section 4(b) of the Voting Rights Act in the Shelby County case was that a challenge to electoral law changes in covered states could no longer be determined by a federal administrative or judicial officer, instead having to be litigated in a court of law on a case-by-case basis, a much more costly and time-consuming process.

By the end of August 2017, federal courts had struck down voter ID laws in Ohio, Texas, North Carolina and Wisconsin. All the cases are likely to be heard ultimately by the US Supreme Court. The court ruled that the legislature's ending of Ohio's "Golden Week" imposed a "modest burden" on the right to vote of African Americans and said that the state's justifications for the law "fail to outweigh that burden." This week had been a period of time when residents could "register to vote and cast an early ballot at the same location."

In 2017, the Texas law was initially struck down at the District level on the grounds that it intended discriminate against black and Hispanic voters, but the decision was reversed by the 5th Circuit. A North Carolina law was overturned as "its provisions deliberately target African-Americans with almost surgical precision … in an effort to depress black turnout at the polls." North Carolina appealed to the US Supreme Court, which declined to hear the appeal, allowing the prior federal court decision to stand. Parts of Wisconsin's voter ID laws were ruled to be unconstitutional and it was advised to accept more forms of identification for the fall 2016 election cycle.

Shelby County v. Holder
On June 25, 2013, the US Supreme Court declared, by a 5–4 decision, in Shelby County v. Holder that Section 4(b) of the Voting Rights Act of 1965 was unconstitutional. Previously, states with a history of proven voter discrimination were required to obtain preclearance from a federal court before making changes to their voting laws. Section 4 of the Act contained the formula for determining which states or political subdivisions were covered by Section 5. The majority opinion argued that the formula used to determine which jurisdictions required federal oversight or preclearance had not been updated to reflect current social conditions, including a decline in institutionalized discrimination and direct voter suppression. The states previously covered under section 5 were: Alabama, Alaska, Arizona, Georgia, Louisiana, Mississippi, South Carolina, Texas, and Virginia, as well as parts of California, Florida, Michigan, New York, North Carolina, and South Dakota. By ruling these restrictions to be unconstitutional, it rendered section 5 unenforceable under the current formula.

Since the Court's decision, several states passed new voter ID laws and other restrictions on registration and on voting. Within 24 hours of the Shelby County verdict, Texas, North Carolina, Mississippi, and Alabama, four states that were previously covered by Section 5 of the Voting Rights Act of 1965 began to implement or stated intentions to implement strict photo ID policies. Texas' proposed policy required a voter to show their passport, driver license or other form of photo ID before they could cast their ballot. However, this policy was found to be discriminatory to black and Hispanic voters, and so it was adapted to include the provision for voters to be able to cast a ballot if they signed an affidavit explaining why they could not obtain a form of photo ID and showed an alternate form of ID, such as a utility bill.  According to a 2018 Brennan Center report, states that previously needed preclearance have purged voters off their rolls at a much higher rate than other states. Additionally, according to another Brennan Center 2018 Poll on the State of Voting, most of the states that were previously covered by Section 5, have recently enacted laws or other measures that restricted voting rights.

Edward K. Olds argues in his December 2017 Columbia Law Review Article "More than "Rarely Used": A Post-"Shelby" Judicial Standard For Section 3 Preclearance" that in the wake of the defeat of Section 5 of the Voting Rights Act, which was struck down by Shelby County v. Holder, Section 3 could take on a very similar role. Section 3 states that  a federal judge can require a jurisdiction to seek pre approval for future policies if it found to be in violation of the Fourteenth or Fifteenth Amendments, however, states that this is unlikely in the current political climate.

In the 2015 Phylon article "A Response to Shelby County, Alabama v. Holder: Energizing, Educating and Empowering Voters," June Gary Hopps and Dorcas Davis Bowles argue that by eliminating section 5 of the Voting Rights Act, Shelby County v. Holder decreased the participation of minorities and that "The participation of these groups is not only important because of the implications for ensuring civil rights, but also for developing social capital within neighborhoods, and increasing positive inter-group relations." This article also states that combined with the Citizens United Supreme Court decision, there is an extreme potential for erosion to civil rights gains, that could "further alienate disenfranchised people."

In the Berkeley Journal of African-American Law & Policy article "The Blinding Color of Race: Elections and Democracy in the Post-Shelby County Era" Sahar Aziz that "the majority in Shelby County lost sight of the objective of the VRA. This historic law was not merely about preventing the most extreme levels or forms of discrimination, but rather having in place a regime that is preventative in nature so as to ensure discrimination continues to decrease and eliminates the possibility of returning to a period of systemic disenfranchisement."

Desmond S. King and Rogers M. Smith argue in their Du Bois Review article "The Last Stand?" that although Shelby v. Holder represents a barrier to African-American political participation, efforts to disproportionately decrease the political power of minorities will long-term, fail to prevent increases in political gains for minorities. However, "they threaten to foster severe conflicts in American politics for years to come."

Studies and analysis
A 2005 report by former President Jimmy Carter and former Secretary of State James Baker concluded that concerns of both those who support and oppose strengthened voter ID laws were legitimate. It recommended voter ID requirements be enacted, to be slowly phased in over a period of five years, and accompanied by the issuance of free ID cards provided by mobile ID vans that would visit traditionally underserved communities. In 2007, a report prepared by the staff of the federal Election Assistance Commission concluded "there is a great deal of debate on the pervasiveness of fraud." Some studies have also found that ID laws can disproportionately disenfranchise low-income voters and voter of color.

Cost of voter identification cards 
According to a Harvard study, "the expenses for documentation, travel, and waiting time [for obtaining voter identification cards] are significant—especially for minority group and low-income voters—typically ranging from about $75 to $175. When legal fees are added to these numbers, the costs range as high as $1,500." So even if the cards themselves may be free, the costs associated with obtaining the card can be expensive. The author of the study notes that the costs associated with obtaining the card far exceeds the $1.50 poll tax (equivalent to $ in ) outlawed by the 24th amendment in 1964.

Fraud prevention
The vast majority of voter ID laws in the United States target only voter impersonation, of which there are only 31 documented cases (some possibly involving multiple voters) in the United States from the 2000–2014 period. According to PolitiFact, "in-person voter fraud—the kind targeted by the ID law—remains extremely rare". The available research and evidence point to the type of fraud that would be prevented by voter ID laws as "very rare" or "extremely rare". PolitiFact finds the suggestion that "voter fraud is rampant" false, giving it its "Pants on Fire" rating. Most cases of alleged voter fraud involving dead voters have been shown to be a result of incorrect matching of voter rolls and death records, such as when someone died after they voted rather than before. Writing in 2009, Harvard political scientist Stephen Ansolabehere noted that despite the common belief "that fraud occurs at least somewhat often in elections … social scientists have been unable to develop unambiguous measures of the incidence of fraud, and legal cases find very little hard evidence on the matter." In a 2012 analysis, News21 of the Walter Cronkite School of Journalism surveyed thousands of election officials in 50 states regarding all instances of fraud relating to elections since 2000, and concluded that in-person voter impersonation is virtually non-existent, amounting to one out of about every 15 million prospective voters.

A 2021 study in the Quarterly Journal of Economics found no evidence that strict voter ID laws had any effect on fraud – actual or perceived.

Proponents of voter ID laws cite the registration of dead and out-of-state voters as a vulnerability in the electoral system. A 2012 report by the Pew Center showed that more than 1.8 million deceased people remain registered to vote nationwide. The same report found 3 million voters registered in multiple states, presumably due to changes of residency. David Becker, the director of Election Initiatives for Pew, said this study's results pointed to the need to improve voter registration, rather than to evidence of voter fraud or suppression.

Proponents of voter ID laws fear that motivated individuals could exploit registration irregularities to impersonate dead voters or impersonate former state residents, casting multiple fraudulent ballots. Critics of such laws note that they only prevent one kind of fraud, namely voter impersonation. They say that this form of fraud is illogical, as the risks (a fine of up to $10,000 and/or 5 years in prison) far outweigh the benefits (casting one extra vote for the voter's desired candidate). Democrats have alleged that the scale of impersonation fraud has been greatly exaggerated by Republicans for political reasons.

A 2012 investigation of 207 alleged dead voters in South Carolina found only five instances unexplained by clerical errors. For instance, sometimes a son with the same name as his dead father was accidentally recorded as voting under the father's name. A study of dead voters in the 2006 Georgia midterm election concluded that only fifteen of the 66 alleged instances of dead voting were potentially fraudulent. All but four of the dead votes were cast absentee, and most of the absentee voters in question cast early ballots but died before the election, giving the impression of voter fraud. A 2013 study testing for additional cases of electoral fraud in addition to two cases that had already been documented found no additional cases of such fraud.

A 2007 report by the liberal Brennan Center for Justice concluded that voter impersonation was rarer than being struck by lightning. The author of this report, Justin Levitt, later reported in 2014 that he had identified only thirty-one credible instances of voter impersonation since 2000, involving a total of 241 ballots, out of a billion ballots cast. Also, in 2007, Lorraine Minnite released a report for Project Vote concluding that voter fraud was "extremely rare" in the United States. In 2014, a survey was published concluding that there was no evidence of widespread voter impersonation in the 2012 U.S. general election.

Proponents of voter ID laws have pointed to a 2014 study by Old Dominion University professors Jesse Richman and David Earnest as justification. The study, which used data developed by the Cooperative Congressional Election Study, concluded that more than 14 percent of self-identified non-citizens in 2008 and 2010 indicated that they were registered to vote, approximately 6.4% of surveyed non-citizens voted in 2008, and 2.2% of surveyed non-citizens voted in 2010. However, the study also concluded that voter ID requirements would be ineffective at reducing non-citizen voting. This study has been criticized by numerous academics. A 2015 study by the managers of the Cooperative Congressional Election Study found that Richman and Earnest's study was "almost certainly flawed" and that, in fact, it was most likely that 0% of non-citizens had voted in recent American elections. Richman and Earnest's findings were the result of measurement error; some individuals who answered the survey checked the wrong boxes in surveys. Richman and Earnest therefore extrapolated from a handful of wrongfully classified cases to achieve an exaggerated number of individuals who appeared to be non-citizen voters. Richman later conceded that "the response error issues … may have biased our numbers". Richman has also rebuked President Trump for claiming that millions voted illegally in 2016. Brian Schaffner, Professor of Political Science at University of Massachusetts, Amherst, who was part of the team that debunked Richman and Earnest's study said that the study

Support for voter ID laws correlates with perceived prevalence of voter fraud. Although absentee ballot fraud is more common than voter impersonation, only six of the 31 states with voter ID laws also impose similar requirements on people who mail in absentee ballots.

Perception of electoral systems
Lorraine Minnite of Demos has criticized proponents of voter ID laws for shifting their arguments in favor of such laws from voter fraud to electoral integrity. In an expert report prepared for the ACLU, she argued that "Calling the problem "electoral integrity" does not change the fact that the only threat to electoral integrity addressed by photo ID laws is in-person voter fraud," and that because such fraud is extremely rare, voter ID laws are not justified to prevent this problem. But in 2005, American University's Commission on Federal Election Reform, co-chaired by former President Jimmy Carter and former Secretary of State James Baker, wrote:

The Commission concluded that, although proven voter impersonation is minimal, a photo ID requirement will ensure election integrity and safeguard public perception of the nation's voting system at little cost to anyone.

However, among certain demographics, voter ID laws lower electoral confidence. A 2016 study concluded that Democrats in states with strict ID laws have reduced faith in the electoral system. It said that negative politicization by the Democratic Party may be to blame. On the other hand, Republicans living in strict photo identification states were more confident in their elections, though possibly due to similar politicization by Republican elites. Another 2015 study found that voters living in states with voter ID laws were not more confident in elections than voters who lived in states without such laws. A 2016 study found that people living in states with voter ID laws were no more confident in their elections than people in states without such laws, nor did they perceive lower rates of voter impersonation fraud. A 2017 study found similar results for both national and local election outcomes.

Turnout 
Studies of the effects of voter ID laws on turnout in the United States have generally found that such laws have little, if any, effect on turnout. This may be because these laws do not reduce turnout very much; it may also be because the strictest voter ID laws have the largest effect on turnout, and they have only been enacted relatively recently. Although most Americans possess a government-issued photo ID, those without ID may have trouble acquiring the proper credentials, lowering their turnout. The most comprehensive study of voter IDs, a 2017 study by Harvard political scientist Stephen Ansolabehere and Tufts political scientist Eitan Hersh, found that in Texas, 1.5% of those who showed up to vote in the 2012 election lacked the kinds of IDs that are targeted by voter ID laws, 4.5% of the total eligible population lacked them, 7.5% of black registered voters lack them. The numbers are likely higher in states with more urban areas, as fewer voters have driving licenses. A 2011 study by New York University's Brennan Center estimated that of the US population that is of voting age, 6–11% lack government-issued photo ID. The Heritage Foundation, a conservative think tank, disputed the methodology of the study, citing a question in which 14 percent of respondents said they had both a U.S. birth certificate and naturalization papers.

Since some legitimate voters lack the kind of IDs demanded by voter ID laws, some commentators have argued that strict voter ID laws reduce voter turnout, especially among poor, black, elderly, disabled, and minority-language voters, and voters who have changed their names. However, the results of studies assessing the effect (or lack thereof) of these laws on turnout have been inconclusive. For example, a 2012 study found that a stricter voter ID law in Georgia lowered turnout by about 0.4% in 2008 compared to 2004. A 2006 study also found that voter ID laws decreased aggregate turnout by between 3 and 4 percent. In contrast, several other studies have failed to demonstrate significant turnout reductions. A 2010 study found that 1.2% of registered voters in three states with voter ID laws (Indiana, Maryland, and Mississippi) lacked an ID that complied with the law. A 2011 study found that photo ID laws were correlated with a 1.6% decline in turnout, and non-photo ID laws were correlated with a 2.2% decline. In a 2014 review by the Government Accountability Office of the academic literature, five studies out of ten found that voter ID laws had no significant effect on overall turnout, four studies found that voter ID laws decreased overall turnout, and one study found that the laws increased overall turnout.

A 2014 Rice University study reported that Texas's voter ID law decreased turnout mainly among people who incorrectly thought they did not have the type of ID needed to comply with the law. The authors of this study also suggested that an education campaign aimed at clearly communicating what types of ID are acceptable in Texas would be beneficial.

A 2016 study argued that, although no clear-cut relationship exists between strict voter ID laws and voter turnout, the disenfranchising impact of voter ID laws may be hidden by Democratic voter mobilization. Strong negative reactions to voter ID laws among Democratic constituencies could, in theory, boost Democratic turnout enough to compensate for effects of the laws themselves. A 2007 report found a small increase in Democratic turnout in places with new voter ID laws.

A 2017 study found that 474 people tried to vote in Virginia's 2014 Senate election, but could not do so because they lacked the proper ID to comply with the state's voter ID law. The same study found that turnout was higher in parts of the state where registered voters were less likely to have a driver's license. The authors suggested that "This unexpected relationship might be explained by a targeted Department of Elections mailing, suggesting that the initial impact of voter ID laws may hinge on efforts to notify voters likely to be affected."

A 2019 paper by Brown University economists found that the implementation of a photo ID law in Rhode Island led to a decline in turnout, registration, and voting among individuals who did not have drivers' licenses.

Disparate impact
Charges of racial discrimination in voter ID laws are founded in the disparate impact doctrine of constitutional law, which claims that any action—intentional or unintentional—that statistically disadvantages a protected class constitutes discrimination. Disparate impact is most often discussed in the context of African Americans. The moral validity and constitutionality of this doctrine is hotly debated. This is relevant to voter ID laws because of accusations that these laws disproportionately reduce turnout among minority voters. According to an assessment of the existing research on voter ID laws by University of Pennsylvania political scientist Dan Hopkins, the research indicates that voter ID laws do disproportionately disenfranchise minority voters. Research also shows that racial minorities are less likely to possess IDs.

Federal appeals courts have struck down strict voter-ID laws in Texas and North Carolina, citing intent by the legislatures to discriminate against minority voters. The appeals court noted that the North Carolina Legislature "requested data on the use, by race, of a number of voting practices"—then, data in hand, "enacted legislation that restricted voting and registration in five different ways, all of which disproportionately affected African Americans." The changes to the voting process "target African Americans with almost surgical precision," and "impose cures for problems that did not exist."

A 2008 study found that the strictest voter ID laws reduced voter turnout relative to the most lax form of such laws (stating one's name). The same study reported that "the stricter voter identification requirements depress turnout to a greater extent for less educated and lower income populations, for both minorities and non-minorities." A 2009 study found that 84% of white registered voters in Indiana had access to photo ID to comply with that state's ID law, as compared to 78% of black voters on the rolls there. A 2008 study found that African Americans, Hispanics, and the elderly were less likely to have a voter ID that complied with Georgia's voter ID law.

A 2012 analysis by Nate Silver found that voter ID laws seem to decrease turnout by between 0.8% and 2.4%, depending on how strict they are, and tend to cause a shift towards the Republican candidate of between 0.4% and 1.2%. Silver found that the statistical reasoning was flawed in a number of studies which had found small effects but had described them as not statistically significant.

In 2012, an investigation by Reuters found that voter ID laws in Georgia and Indiana had not led to lower turnout of minorities and concluded that concerns about this "are probably overstated". In a 2014 review by the Government Accountability Office of the academic literature, three studies out of five found that voter ID laws reduced minority turnout whereas two studies found no significant impact.

A 2014 study by the Government Accountability Office reported that voter ID laws in Kansas and Tennessee reduced turnout in these states by 1.9 and 2.2 percent, respectively, compared to four states that did not pass voter ID laws—Alabama, Arkansas, Delaware, and Maine. The study indicates that young people, black people, and newly registered voters were most likely to have their turnout reduced. But Tennessee officials suggested that the reduced turnout may have been due to a lack of compelling ballot measures in 2012, and Kansas officials dismissed the drop in black voters as a product of high random variance in a small population. Tennessee officials questioned the reproducibility of this report, given its reliance on data from Catalist, which they claimed was a progressive political group.

A 2014 study from the University of Iowa found no evidence that strict voter ID laws reduce minority turnout. A 2012 study found that, although the Georgia voter ID laws lowered overall turnout by 0.4%, there was no racial or ethnic component to the suppression effect.

Disparate impact may also be reflected in access to information about voter ID laws. A 2015 experimental study found that election officials queried about voter ID laws were slightly more likely to respond to emails from a non-Latino Anglo or European name (70.5% response rate) than a Latino name (64.8% response rate), though response accuracy was similar across those groups.

Studies have also analyzed racial differences in ID requests rates. A 2012 study in the city of Boston found strong evidence that non-white voters were more likely to be asked for ID during the 2008 election. According to exit polls, 23% of whites, 33% of Asians, 33% of blacks, and 38% of Hispanics were asked for ID, though this effect is partially attributed to black and Hispanics preferring non-peak voting hours when election officials inspected a greater portion of IDs. Precinct differences confound the data, as black and Hispanic voters tended to vote at black and Hispanic-majority precincts.

A 2010 study of the 2006 midterm election in New Mexico found that election officials asked Hispanics for ID more often than they did early voters, women, and non-Hispanics. A 2009 study of the 2006 midterm elections nationwide found that 47% of white voters reported being asked to show photo identification at the polls, compared with 54% of Hispanics and 55% of African Americans." Very few people were denied the chance to vote as a result of voter identification requests. A 2015 study found that turnout among blacks in Georgia was generally higher since the state began enforcing its strict voter ID law.

A 2017 study in the Journal of Politics "shows that strict identification laws have a differentially negative impact on the turnout of racial and ethnic minorities in primaries and general elections. We also find that voter ID laws skew democracy toward those on the political right." The results of this study were challenged in a paper by Stanford political scientist Justin Grimmer and four other political scientists. The paper says that the findings in the aforementioned study "a product of data inaccuracies, the presented evidence does not support the stated conclusion, and alternative model specifications produce highly variable results. When errors are corrected, one can recover positive, negative, or null estimates of the effect of voter ID laws on turnout, precluding firm conclusions." In a response, the authors of the original study dismissed the aforementioned criticisms, and stood by the findings of the original article. Columbia University statistician and political scientist Andrew Gelman said that the response by the authors of the original study "did not seem convincing" and that the finding of racial discrepancies in the original study does not stand.

A 2017 report by Civis Analytics for the liberal super PAC Priorities USA purported to show that Hillary Clinton lost Wisconsin the 2016 presidential election due to voter suppression brought on by Wisconsin's strict voter ID laws. Political scientists expressed serious skepticism of the report's methodology; Yale University political scientist Eitan Hersh said the report "does not meet acceptable evidence standards." A 2017 paper by University of Wisconsin-Madison political scientists Kenneth Mayer and Michael DeCrescenzo also purported to show that voter suppression swayed Wisconsin from Clinton; this paper was also rebutted by other political scientists on the basis of poor methodology.

A 2019 paper by University of Bologna and Harvard Business School economists found that voter ID laws had "no negative effect on registration or turnout, overall or for any group defined by race, gender, age, or party affiliation."

A 2019 study in the journal Electoral Studies found that the implementation of voter ID laws in South Carolina reduced overall turnout but did not have a disparate impact. 2019 studies in Political Science Quarterly and the Atlantic Economic Journal found no evidence that voter ID laws have a disproportionate influence on minorities.

A 2022 study found that Black and Latino voters were disproportionately likely to vote without ID.

International comparisons
Many nations require some form of voter identification at the polling place, but specific details of the requirement vary widely. In Spain, Greece, France, Belgium, India and Italy, a government-issued photo ID is required to cast a ballot. Mexico has a similar system, with all registered voters receiving a photo ID upon completing the registration process. Several Western democracies do not require identification for voting, such as Denmark, Australia, New Zealand, and the United Kingdom. In Ireland, Sweden, and Switzerland, poll workers reserve the right to request identification but are not required to do so. In Canada, identification is required, but voters can provide any two forms of ID from a list of 45 possibilities. Canada's system is more stringent than the 17 U.S. states that do not require ID but less stringent than the 22 U.S. states with strict requirements. The strict Indiana ID system, for instance, accepts only five forms of ID: an Indiana driver's license, an Indiana ID card, a military ID, a US passport, or a student ID card from an in-state college or university. Conversely, some countries, like Australia, require no form of identification at any election. This position is similar to the situation in New York and California.

Several developing nations have instituted voter ID laws. Many Arab nations require voters to leave a fingerprint upon casting a ballot, allowing quick detection of fraud. In 2012, the head of Libya's national election commission expressed surprise that the American system "depends so much on trust and the good faith of election officials and voters alike". The Gambia gives each voter a single marble to cast, ensuring that no one can vote multiple times.

Public opinion
Public opinion polls have shown broad support for voter ID laws among voters in the United States. A 2011 Rasmussen poll found that 75% of likely voters "believe voters should be required to show photo identification, such as a driver's license, before being allowed to vote." A 2012 Fox News poll produced similar results, revealing that 87% of Republicans, 74% of independent voters, and 52% of Democrats supported new voter ID laws. More recently, a 2021 Pew Research poll showed that 93% of Republicans and 61% of Democrats favor requirements that voters show government-issued photo ID to vote.

Although all major political demographics support voter ID laws, a 2013 study showed significant divergence in opinion between conservative-affiliated demographics, which are staunch supporters, and liberal-affiliated demographics, which are less supportive. The study also showed that support depends on survey framing: when questions biased against voter ID laws are asked, support drops 15% compared to when questions favorable to voter ID laws are asked. A 2016 study showed that emphasizing the adverse effects of voter ID laws on eligible voters decreased popular support for such laws. Another 2016 study found that white people with high levels of implicit racism, but not explicit racism, were more supportive of voter ID laws when they were exposed to a fear-eliciting condition. A 2016 study found that partisan affiliation is a major determinant of support for voter ID laws and that Republicans are much more likely than Democrats to be concerned about voter fraud. Research shows that individuals who hold hostile views towards nonwhite immigrants are most likely to believe that voter fraud is rampant.

Former Attorney General Eric Holder and others have compared the laws to a poll tax, in which southern states during the Jim Crow Era imposed voting fees, which discourage black and even some poor whites until the passage of grandfather clauses from voting.

Politicization of voter ID issues 

In 2014, a study released by the Congressional Research Service concluded that, in the absence of systematic risk analyses, it is difficult to determine what points in the election process—voter registration, voting systems, polling place location and hours, pollworker training, voter identification, vote tabulation, or other steps—involve the greatest potential risks to election integrity and therefore warrant the greatest attention. Another 2014 study argued that careful voter roll maintenance is probably a more effective method for preventing voter fraud than voter ID laws.

A 2015 study found that local coverage of voter fraud during the 2012 elections was greatest in presidential swing states and states that passed strict vote ID laws prior to the 2012 election. There was no evidence that the reporting was related to the actual rate of voter fraud in each state. Based on this data, the authors concluded that "parties and campaigns sought to place voter fraud on the political agenda in strategically important states to motivate their voting base ahead of the election". Another 2015 study found a similar correlation between the enactment of voter ID laws and a state's electoral competitiveness, suggesting electioneering motives.

A 2016 study found polarization over voter ID laws was less stark in state legislatures where electoral competition was not intense. The same 2016 study found a notable relationship between the racial composition of a member's district, region, and electoral competition, and the likelihood that a state lawmaker supported a voter ID bill. The study found that "Democratic lawmakers representing substantial black district populations are more opposed to restrictive voter ID laws, whereas Republican legislators with substantial black district populations are more supportive." Southern lawmakers (particularly Democrats) were more opposed to restrictive voter ID legislation. Black legislators in the South were the least supportive of restrictive voter ID bills. A 2018 experimental study in Legislative Studies Quarterly, which sent messages from Latino and white constituents to lawmakers, found that lawmakers who supported voter ID laws were less likely to respond to messages sent by Latino constituents.

A 2017 study in American Politics Research found that the adoption of voter ID laws is most likely when control of the governor's office and state legislature switches to Republicans, and when the size of black and Latino populations in the state increases. Another 2017 study found that the different advertising strategies used to advertise Kansas' voter ID laws by different county clerks influenced the effect of these laws on turnout.

A 2018 study by the Williams Institute found that 137,000 transgender people who have transitioned were eligible to vote in the 2018 US elections in states with strict voter ID laws. An estimated 57% of them may not have identification or documentation that states their preferred gender.  Eight states currently have strict voter ID laws that require voters to provide a government-issued photo ID in order to vote at the polls. In these states, election officials and poll workers decide whether a voter's identification accurately identifies the voter and matches the information listed in the voter registration rolls.

Several states controlled by Democrats maintain voter ID laws. For instance, Hawaii has required a state-issued photo ID for decades. In 2011, the Rhode Island legislature enacted a photo ID requirement, which was signed by governor Lincoln Chafee, making Rhode Island the most recent state controlled by Democrats to pass such legislation. However, both Hawaii and Rhode Island are "non-strict photo ID states", meaning that, in some circumstances, an affidavit or other legal measure can satisfy the ID requirement. In 2021, many Democrats, including Joe Manchin, Stacey Abrams and Raphael Warnock signalled a general openness to voter ID laws in the context of the For the People Act. The Washington Post observed an "evolution" by many Democrats on the issue, some of whom were no longer as strongly opposed to voter ID, and in a few cases, went on record to say they had never really been opposed to it.

Registration and election day voter ID laws by state

See also
Election Integrity Commission
 Identity documents in the United States
 Transgender disenfranchisement in the United States#Voter ID history
 Voter fraud in the United States
 Voter identification laws
 Voter suppression in the United States

Notes

References

Further reading 

Alexander Keyssar. 2009. The Right to Vote: The Contested History of Democracy in the United States. Basic Books.
The Brennan Center's compilation of research on voter ID.
 State Voter Identification Requirements: Analysis, Legal Issues, and Policy Considerations. Washington, DC: Congressional Research Service, October 21, 2016.
Historical account suggesting photo identification for voting: Scientific American, "A Suggestion In Photography", 27 November 1880, p. 337

Electoral fraud in the United States
United States election law
Electoral restrictions
History of voting rights in the United States
ID laws in the United States
States of the United States law-related lists